Restless Heart is the debut album by American country music group Restless Heart. It was released by RCA Nashville in March 1985. "Let the Heartache Ride," "I Want Everyone to Cry," "(Back to the) Heartbreak Kid" and "Til I Loved You" were released as singles. The album reached #10 on the Top Country Albums chart.

Track listing

Personnel 

Restless Heart
 Larry Stewart – lead vocals, keyboards
 David Innis – vocals, keyboards
 Greg Jennings – vocals, guitars
 Paul Gregg – vocals, bass
 John Dittrich – vocals, drums

Additional Musicians
 Verlon Thompson – guitars
 Michael Rhodes – bass 
 Dennis Holt – percussion

Production 
 Restless Heart – producers
 Tim DuBois – producer 
 Scott Hendricks – producer, engineer, mixing 
 J. T. Cantwell – assistant engineer
 Phil Dihel – assistant engineer 
 Clark Schleicher – assistant engineer 
 Bob Ludwig – mastering 
 Jim Osborn – art direction, design 
 Mark Tucker – photography
 Mixed at MasterMix (Nashville, Tennessee).
 Mastered at Masterdisk (New York City, New York).

Charts

Weekly charts

Year-end charts

References

1985 debut albums
Restless Heart albums
RCA Records albums
Albums produced by Scott Hendricks